Magnus Grubb Bramming (born 1 October 1990) is a Danish handball player for TTH Holstebro and the Danish national team.

He also played for Nordsjælland Håndbold, he is in family with Oliver Bramming Viborg HK, Himmelev Håndbold, Roskilde Håndbold.

Individual awards
 2018–19 EHF Cup Top scorer: On 19 May 2019 after the final four tournament he set an all-time scoring record for an EHF Cup season, with 100 goals.

References

External links

1990 births
Living people
Danish male handball players
People from Roskilde
TTH Holstebro players
Sportspeople from Region Zealand